"Future Stock" is the 21st episode in the third season of Futurama. It originally aired on the Fox network in the United States on March 31, 2002.

Plot
Planet Express holds its stockholders' meeting, and the state of the business is not good. Uninterested in the meeting, Fry and Dr. Zoidberg wander off in search of food. Fry finds his way into a support group meeting for cryogenic clients who have been defrosted, where he meets a sleazy 1980s businessman (referred to only as "That Guy" throughout the episode, though named in the script as Steve Castle). Resembling Gordon Gekko, That Guy arranged to have himself frozen to await a cure for his terminal "boneitis", having gutted a company that was close to developing a cure for $100,000,000.

Fry and That Guy return to the Planet Express stockholders' meeting, where a revolt against Professor Farnsworth is in progress. Fry nominates That Guy as new CEO, and That Guy beats out the Professor by one vote. That Guy names Fry his new Vice Chairman, and sets out to remake Planet Express by giving it an expensive image overhaul.

That Guy spends tremendous amounts of money on lavish, pricey, flashy items such as flying chairs, expensive suits, and an enigmatic television commercial. Annoyed, Zoidberg sells his stock to That Guy for a sandwich, exclaiming, "Net gain for Zoidberg!".  After draining the company's funds and its employees' morale, That Guy announces that he is selling Planet Express to Mom.

The takeover begins at the orbiting Intergalactic Stock Exchange, and all the Planet Express employees vote against it. Unfortunately, the stock That Guy bought from Zoidberg gave him a controlling interest and That Guy outvotes them. Mom and her sons vote for the merger.

However, before the final approval takes place, That Guy abruptly succumbs to a lethal attack of boneitis, causing his body to contort as his bones snap, twist and curl. In his death-throes, That Guy admits he was so busy "being an '80s guy", he had forgotten to cure the disease.

Fry gains control of That Guy's shares, and announces his intention to vote against the merger. The Planet Express staff initially tries to convince him to sell the company, because the sale of their stock will make them all rich. However, Fry's speech drove the stock's price through the floor to three cents each. Since the staff will be poor no matter what he does, he votes against the merger. The staff leaves to spend the weekend in disappointment over the loss of their potential wealth.

Cultural references
The title is wordplay on Future Shock, a book written by the futurist Alvin Toffler in 1970. The Planet Express advert, in which a woman hurls a Planet Express box at a giant glass screen with Mom on it, is a parody of the famous 1984 television advert that introduced the Apple Macintosh. At 'The Big Ape Fight', Calculon uses a similar line from the original Planet of the Apes film in the style of Charlton Heston. The episode also references the 1987 film Wall Street and other 1980s films related to stockbroking.

Broadcast and reception
In its initial airing, the episode received a Nielsen rating of 2.7/6, placing it 94th among primetime shows for the week of March 25–31, 2002. The episode was given an A by the A.V. Club.

References

External links

Future Stock at The Infosphere.

Futurama (season 3) episodes
2002 American television episodes